The canton of Châtenay-Malabry is a French administrative division, located in the arrondissement of Antony, in the Hauts-de-Seine département (Île-de-France région). Its borders were modified at the French canton reorganisation which came into effect in March 2015. Its seat is in Châtenay-Malabry.

Composition 
The canton consists of the following communes:
 Châtenay-Malabry
 Le Plessis-Robinson
 Sceaux

Adjacent cantons 
 Canton of Châtillon (north)
 Canton of Bagneux (northeast)
 Canton of Clamart (west)
 Canton of Antony (southeast)

See also
Cantons of the Hauts-de-Seine department
Communes of the Hauts-de-Seine department

References

Chatenay-Malabry